Spitzer is a surname. Notable people with the surname include:

 Andre Spitzer (1945–1972), Israeli fencing coach and victim of the Munich massacre
 Bernard Spitzer (1924–2014), American real estate developer and philanthropist, father of Eliot Spitzer
 Eliot Spitzer (born 1959), 54th Governor of New York (2007–2008)
 Frank Spitzer (1926–1992), Austrian-born American mathematician, author of Spitzer's formula
 Frédéric Spitzer, 19th century art dealer, after whom the Spitzer Cross is named
 Leo Spitzer (1887–1960), Austrian linguist
 Lyman Spitzer (1914–1997), American theoretical physicist and mountaineer
 Moritz Spitzer, scholar who gave his name to the Spitzer Manuscript
 Robert Spitzer (priest) (born 1952), American Jesuit priest and president of Gonzaga University (1998–2009)
 Robert R. Spitzer (1922–2019), American agricultural researcher and president of the Milwaukee School of Engineering (1977–1991)
 Robert Spitzer (political scientist) (born 1953), American political scientist
 Robert Spitzer (psychiatrist) (1932–2015), American psychiatrist
 Toba Spitzer, American rabbi and president of the Reconstructionist Rabbinical Association (2007–2009)
 Todd Spitzer (born 1960), district attorney of Orange County, California, since 2019 and member of the California State Assembly (2002–2008)
 Šime Spitzer (1892–1941), Croatian Zionist
 Simon Spitzer (1826–1887), Austrian mathematician
 Walter Spitzer (1937–2006), Canadian epidemiologist and professor

See also 
 
 Spitzer Space Telescope
 Spitz (disambiguation)
 Rudolf Lothar (born Rudolf Lothar Spitzer, 1865–1943), Hungarian-born Austrian writer, playwright, critic and essayist 

German-language surnames
Jewish surnames